Richard B. Hoover (born 1943) is an American scientist.

Richard Hoover may also refer to:

Richard Hoover (set designer), see Drama Desk Award for Outstanding Set Design
Richard R. Hoover, special effects artist
Dick Hoover, bowler
Dick Hoover (baseball)
Dick Hoover (baseball coach), see Binghamton Bearcats baseball